The 1965 VFL Grand Final was an Australian rules football game contested between the Essendon Football Club and St Kilda Football Club, held at the Melbourne Cricket Ground in Melbourne on 25 September 1965. It was the 68th annual grand final of the Victorian Football League, staged to determine the premiers for the 1965 VFL season. The match, attended by 104,846 spectators, was won by Essendon by a margin of 35 points, marking that club's 12th premiership victory.

St Kilda were minor premiers for the first time in their history and, after beating Collingwood by a point in the semi-final, found themselves competing in just their second-ever grand final and first since 1913, which they lost to Fitzroy. Essendon, on the other hand, last won a premiership three years previously.

The Bombers set up their win in the third quarter, scoring five goals to just one by the Saints. Ted Fordham kicked seven goals for Essendon.

The game was considered lost media for many years. However, the ABC was able to locate an archived copy of the game decades after.

Teams

Statistics

Goalkickers

Attendance
 MCG crowd – 104,846

References

External links
Summary of the 1965 season including finals
Essendon's premiership team

See also
 1965 VFL season

VFL/AFL Grand Finals
Grand
Essendon Football Club
St Kilda Football Club